A kremlin is a major fortified central complex found in historic Russian cities. This word is often used to refer to the most famous one, the Moscow Kremlin, or metonymically to the government that is based there. Other such fortresses are called detinets, such as the Novgorod Detinets.

Etymology
The Russian word is of uncertain origin. Different versions include the word originating from the Turkic languages, the Greek language or from Baltic languages. The word may share the same root as kremen''' ("flint").

 History 

 Kremlins in Rus' 
The Slavs began to build fortresses to protect their lands from enemies in the ninth century. It is known that the Scandinavians called the Slavic lands the land of fortresses—"Gardariki". Arabic geographer Al-Bakri wrote: "And that is how the Slavs build a large part of their fortresses: they head for meadows, rich in water and reeds, and there mark a round or rectangular place, depending on the shape they want to make a fortress, and they dig around the moat, and the dugout earth is dumped in a rampart, reinforcing it with planks and piles, like beaten earth, until the wall reaches the desired height. Then they measure the door at whichever side they want, and approach by a wooden bridge". In ancient times, a wooden fence was built on the crest of a rampart, a palisade or zapolot (the wall made of logs, vertically one above the other, and connected with horizontally laid timbers). The way of defending the settlement was primitive; later wooden fortress walls became more preferable.

In the VIII century, the earliest known stone and wooden fortress—Lubšanská fortress near Staraya Ladoga was built. The ancient stone and wooden kremlins include a fortress on Truvorov settlement near Izborsk (IX century) and the first Stara Ladoga Kremlin (the end of IX century, later rebuilt). Single stone towers, gates and bends of walls appeared in other cities (Vladimir, Kyiv, Novgorod, Pereyaslavl): the Golden Gate of Kievan citadel and the gate of the Vladimir Kremlin bearing the same name survived.

A special type of wooden and stone Kremlins appeared under the influence of architectural traditions of Poland and Hungary. They were characterised by the juxtaposition of wooden walls and towers with vezha—high stone towers standing inside the fortress, which were used as watchtowers. Constructions, called Volyn towers, were erected, for example, in the citadels of Kholmsk, Kamenets and Gorodeni.

During the Mongol-Tatar invasion, many Russian wooden and stone-wooden fortresses were taken and destroyed by the Mongols. The long-lasting Mongol-Tatar yoke slowed down the development of Russian fortification architecture for a century and a half, as internecine wars stopped and the need to build fortresses disappeared.

The tradition of fortress construction was preserved in Novgorod and Pskov lands which were not damaged by the Mongol invasion. Here are built not only kremlins (Izborsk, Porkhov) but—for the first time in Russia—fortresses, which were not many cities in the full sense of the word, as defensive structures (Koporie, Oreshek, Yam, Korela, Ostrov, Kobyla). The strongest of the Russian fortresses was the Pskov Kremlin, which had no equal in Russia in the number of sustained sieges.

 Kremlins of the Russian state 
The term Kremlin (in the variant Kremnik) is first encountered in chronicles of 1317 in accounts of the construction of the Tver Kremlin, where a wooden city-fortress was erected, which was clayed and whitewashed.

Wooden fortresses were erected everywhere in the Russian state—from the Far East lands to the Swedish borders. They were numerous in the South, where they served as a link of fortified fortification zones cutting off the way to the central regions from Crimean Tatars. Aesthetically wooden fortresses were not inferior to stone ones—and we can regret that the towers of wooden kremlins have not survived to this day. Wooden fortresses were built quickly: in 1638 in Mtsensk fortress walls of Bolshoi Ostrog and Pletny Gorod with a total length of about 3 kilometres with 13 towers and almost one hundred meters long bridge over the River Zusha were erected in 20 days. The town of Sviyazhsk was built similarly during the Kazan campaign in the spring of 1551: fortress walls about 2.5 kilometres long, many churches and houses were erected in a month.

Later on, many Kremlins were rebuilt and strengthened. Thus, the Moscow Kremlin under Ivan the Third was reconstructed of bricks.

In the 16th–17th centuries, about 30 stone fortresses were built in the Russian State. New Kremlins have regular geometric forms in plan (Zaraisky and Tula Kremlins). The Tula Kremlin is unique because it was built in a valley (which was possible because of undeveloped siege artillery of nomad Tatars).

Construction of the Kremlin lasted until the turn of the XVII–XVIII centuries. The last Kremlin structure was built of stone in 1699–1717 in the town of Tobolsk (the easternmost Kremlin in Russia).

 In Russia 
World Heritage Sites 
 Moscow Kremlin
 Novgorod Kremlin
 Solovetsky Monastery
 Suzdal Kremlin
 Kazan Kremlin

 Intact 
 Astrakhan Kremlin
 Kolomna Kremlin
 Nizhny Novgorod Kremlin 
 Pskov Kremlin
 Rostov Kremlin (a bishop's residence, not formally considered a kremlin)
 
 Smolensk Kremlin  
 Tobolsk Kremlin (the sole stone kremlin in Siberia)
 Tula Kremlin
 Zaraysk Kremlin
 Ivangorod Fortress (not formally considered a kremlin)
 Oreshek Fortress (not formally considered a kremlin)
 Staraya Ladoga
 Alexandrov Kremlin (a czar residence, not formally considered a kremlin)
 Korela Fortress (not formally considered a kremlin)
 Izborsk Kremlin

 In ruins 
 Gdov Kremlin
 Porkhov Kremlin
 Serpukhov Kremlin
 Velikie Luki Kremlin
 Torzhok Kremlin
 Mozhaysk Kremlin
 Fortress of Koporye (not formally considered a kremlin)
 Vyazma Kremlin (one tower)
 Syzran Kremlin (one tower, 1683)
 Ufa

 Existing and unwalled 
 Vladimir Kremlin (Tower Golden Gate and bank)
 Dmitrov
 Ryazan
 Vologda (a bishop residence, not formally considered a kremlin)
 Yaroslavl (two towers)
 Pereslavl-Zalessky
 Khlynov (Vyatka)
 Volokolamsk

 Traces remain 
 Borovsk
 Opochka
 Zvenigorod
 Starodub
 Tver – a wooden fortress was burned down in a fire in 1763
 Sknyatino – underwater since flooding during the 1930s.
 Yam fortress (not formally considered a kremlin)
 Fortress of Radonezh
 Ryazan
  (60 km from modern Ryazan)
 Ostrov (14th-15th centuries)
  Belgorod (bank of fortress)
 Vereya
 Kaluga
 Kleshchin
 Kostroma
 Pustozyorsk
 Uglich
 Staritsa
 Sviyazhsk
 Cheboksary
 Yuryev-Polsky
 Aleksin
 Opochka
 Oryol
 
 Mtsensk
 Raskiel

 Modern imitations 

 Izmaylovo Kremlin
 Yoshkar Ola

 Outside Russia 
After the disintegrations of the Kievan Rus, the Russian Empire and the USSR, some fortresses considered Kremlin-type, remained beyond the borders of modern Russia. Some are listed below:
 Belz, Ukraine (only traces)
 Kyiv, Ukraine (reconstructed tower of the Golden Gate)
 Putyvl, Ukraine
 Novhorod-Siverskyi, Ukraine
 Chernihiv, Ukraine (only traces)
 Kamyanyets, Belarus (shafts and Belaya Vezha tower)
 Belgorod Kievsky, Ukraine (now village Belgorodka)

The same structure in Novgorodshina, Ukraine and other Old Russian territories is also called dytynets (from dytyna – child). The term has been in use since the 11th century. The term kremlin first appeared in 14th century in various Russian territories, where it replaced dytynets''.

Many Russian monasteries have been built in a fortress-like style similar to that of a kremlin. For a partial list, see Monasteries in Russia.

See also 
 Citadel

References

Further reading 
 Воронин Н. Н. Владимир, Боголюбово, Суздаль, Юрьев-Польской. М.: Искусство, 1967.
 Кирьянов И. А. Старинные крепости Нижегородского Поволжья. Горький: Горьк. книжн. изд., 1961.
 Косточкин В. В. Русское оборонное зодчество конца XIII — начала XVI веков. М.: Издательство Академии наук, 1962.
 Крадин Н. П. Русское деревянное оборонное зодчество". М.: Искусство, 1988.
 Раппопорт П. А. Древние русские крепости. М.: Наука, 1965.
 Раппопорт П. А. Зодчество Древней Руси. Л.: Наука, 1986.
 Раппопорт П. А. Строительное производство Древней Руси (X—XIII вв.). СПб: Наука, СПб, 1994.
 Сурмина И. О. Самые знаменитые крепости России. М.: Вече, 2002.
 Тихомиров М. Н. Древнерусские города. М.: Гос. изд. полит. лит-ры, 1956.
 Яковлев В. В. Эволюция долговременной фортификации. М.: Воениздат, 1931.

External links 
 
 Russian Fortification Architecture
 Twelve Russian Kremlins
 

Fortifications in Russia